Results from Norwegian football in 1925.

Class A of local association leagues
Class A of local association leagues (kretsserier) is the predecessor of a national league competition.

Norwegian Cup

First round

Aalesund, Brann, Drafn, Frigg, Hamar, Kvik (Fredrikshald), Lillestrøm, Lyn, Odd, Ready, Sarpsborg, Trygg, Urædd and Ørn received a bye to the second round.

Second round

Brann, Djerv, Lyn (Gjøvik), Mjøndalen, Moss, Odd, Trygg and Ørn received a bye to the third round.

Third round

|}

Fourth round

|}

Quarter-finals

|}

Semi-finals

|}

Final
Date: 18 October 1925

|}

National team

Sources:

References

 
Seasons in Norwegian football
1925 in Norwegian sport